The Josseline class is a series of 5 container ships built for Zodiac Maritime and operated by Mediterranean Shipping Company (MSC). The ships were built by Hyundai Heavy Industries in South Korea. The ships have a maximum theoretical capacity of 14,336 twenty-foot equivalent units (TEU).

List of ships

References 

Container ship classes
Ships built by Hyundai Heavy Industries Group